Hazel's Amazing Mother is an American children's picture book written by Rosemary Wells, published in 1985. It was one of the New York Times Best Illustrated Children's Books of the Year in 1985.

Plot
Hazel is out for a walk with her beloved doll Eleanor. But when she makes a wrong turn, she encounters some kids who are up to no good. Fortunately, Hazel's amazing mother is there to rescue her, and set the bullies straight just in the nick of time.

References

1985 children's books
American children's books
American picture books
Children's fiction books
English-language books
Fictional badgers
Fictional children
Fictional dolls and dummies
Books about families
Anthropomorphic animals
Bullying in fiction
United States in fiction
Female characters in literature
Child characters in literature
Literary characters introduced in 1985